Somerford may refer to:

Places

England 
 Somerford, Cheshire, a civil parish
 Somerford Park, Cheshire, a former country house
 Somerford, Dorset, a district of Christchurch
 Somerford Booths, a civil parish in Cheshire
 Somerford Hall, a mansion house in Staffordshire
 Somerford Keynes, a village in Gloucestershire
 Great Somerford, a village in Wiltshire
 Little Somerford, a village in Wiltshire

United States 
 Somerford Township, Madison County, Ohio

People

Surname 
 Thomas Somerford (1881–1948), British architect

See also 
 Summerford (disambiguation)